"Missing link" is a non-scientific term originated from early discussions of human evolution. The term may refer to:

Biology
 Missing link (human evolution), a non-scientific term typically referring to transitional fossils
 Piltdown Man, a hoax in which bone fragments were presented as the "missing link" between ape and man

Art, entertainment, and media

Films 
 The Missing Links (1916 film), a 1916 American silent crime film directed by Lloyd Ingraham
 The Missing Link (1927 film), an American silent comedy film directed by Charles Reisner
 The Missing Link (1980 film), a 1980 Franco-Belgian animated film directed by Picha
 Missing Link (1988 film), a 1988 film directed by Carol and David Hughes
 Missing Link (2019 film), a 2019 stop-motion animation film directed by Chris Butler

Games and puzzles
 Missing Link (puzzle), a 1981 mechanical puzzle
 Deus Ex: Human Revolution – The Missing Link, downloadable content for the 2011 video game Deus Ex: Human Revolution

Literature
 Missing Link (comics), name of four fictional characters in Marvel Comics
 Missing Links, a book by Rick Reilly
 The Missing Link, a novel in the Fourth World trilogy by Kate Thompson

Music

Albums
 The Missing Link (Fred Anderson album), a 1984 album by American jazz saxophonist Fred Anderson
 Missing Links (album), Missing Links Volume Two, or Missing Links Volume Three, a series of compilation albums by The Monkees, released 1987–1996
 The Missing Link (Rage album),a  1993 album by heavy metal band Rage
 The Missing Link (Jeremy Enigk album), a 2007 album by Jeremy Enigk
 The Missing Links (album), a 2012 album by Pennsylvania hardcore punk band Wisdom In Chains
 Missing Link (EP), a 2017 extended play (EP) by Australian musician Nick Murphy

Songs
 "Missing Link", a 2001 Machinae Supremacy song
 "Missing Link", a song by The Hives from the 2004 album Tyrannosaurus Hives
 "Missing Links", a song by Plan B from the 2006 album Who Needs Actions When You Got Words

Other music
 Missing Link (band), a German pop group
 The Missing Links, an Australian rock band active from 1964 to 1966
 Missing Link Records, an Australian-based independent record label

Television 
 Missing Link (TV series), a sports program on ESPN Classic hosted by Colin Cowherd
 Missing Links (game show), a game show hosted by Ed McMahon and Dick Clark
 "A Missing Link", an episode of Alias
 "Missing Link", an episode of Code Lyoko
 "Missing Link" (Space: 1999), an episode of Space: 1999
 "The Missing Link", an episode of Colonel March of Scotland Yard
 "The Missing Link", an episode of Supergirl
 "The Missing Link", an episode of The Legend of Zelda
 "Missing Links", an episode of the sitcom The King of Queens

Other art, entertainment, and media
 Missing Link, an avantgardistic group of architects from 1970 to 1980 with Angela Hareiter, Otto Kapfinger and Adolf Krischanitz in Austria
 Missing Link, a car constructor and racing team in the TV series Future GPX Cyber Formula
 Missing Link, a character in the Monsters vs. Aliens franchise
 The Missing Link (wrestler) or Dewey Robertson (1939–2007), professional wrestler